Mob Town is a 1941 Universal film starring the Dead End Kids and the Little Tough Guys.

Plot
A man is convicted of murder and sentenced to death for the crime.  His brother, who idolized him, meets a cop, Sgt. Frank Conroy, who attempts to stop the boy and his gang of friends from ending up the same way as his brother did.  He enrolls them in a recreational program and helps them get jobs. However, things change when the kid finds out that Conroy was the cop who arrested his brother, which resulted in his execution.

Cast

Dead End Kids and Little Tough Guys
 Billy Halop as Tom Barker
 Huntz Hall as Pig
 Gabriel Dell as String
 Bernard Punsly as Ape

Additional Cast
 Dick Foran as Sgt. Frank Conroy
 Anne Gwynne as Marion Barker
 Darryl Hickman as Butch Malone aka Shrimp
 Samuel S. Hinds as Judge Luther Bryson
 Victor Kilian as Uncle Lon Barker
 Truman Bradley as Officer Cuttler
 John Butler as Rummell
 John Sheehan as Mr. Loomis
 Emory Parnell as Captain Harrington - Police Chief

References

External links

1941 films
1941 crime films
American black-and-white films
American crime films
Films directed by William Nigh
Universal Pictures films
1940s English-language films
1940s American films